Cottonpickin' Chickenpickers is a 1967 American film made by Southeastern Pictures Corporation whose cast includes some major country music performers.

It was the final feature film of silent movie great Lila Lee and of 1940s Hollywood leading man Sonny Tufts.

Cast
Del Reeves
Hugh X. Lewis
Sonny Tufts
Tommy Noonan
Maxie Rosenbloom
Lila Lee
Greta Thyssen
David Houston
Mel Tillis

References

External links

1967 films
American comedy films
1967 comedy films
1960s English-language films
1960s American films